Shivraj Singh (born 30 September 1975) is an Indian polo player. He is the son of Gaj Singh, the King of Jodhpur.

Education
Shivraj was educated at Mayo College in Ajmer, then moving on to Eton College, where he played polo for Eton. After leaving Eton, Shivraj studied at Oxford Brookes University, where he received a degree in Business Administration. After graduating from university, Shivraj worked with the Schroder's Bank of Geneva and London and Jardine in Hong Kong before returning home. He is now involved in the business of managing the palace hotel group which includes Umaid Bhawan, Bal Samand, Sardar Samand, and various festivities and functions involving the Jodhpur Royal Family.

Polo career
Shivraj is a polo player. He is primarily responsible for training the Jodhpur polo team.

Rambagh accident
He suffered a serious head injury during a Birla Cup match at the Rambagh Polo Ground in February 2005. Shivraj slipped into coma and was rushed to the SMS Hospital after he lost consciousness. There was a clot in his brain, so on 21 February he was taken to Mumbai for surgery at Tata Hospital, but he remained in a coma for over two months. Eleven months later, he had recovered enough to speak in short sentences and move about in a wheelchair. His first public appearance since the accident was at his father's 58th birthday party held on the Baradari Lawns on 13 January 2006; however, he watched from his balcony. Shivranjani Raje told reporters he is active and rehabilitating with the help of an American occupational physiotherapist. He can reportedly walk with some assistance.

Marriage
He was engaged to Gayatri Kumari Pal from Lucknow, the former royal family of Askot in Uttaranchal on 10 March 2010. The engagement ceremony took place at the Umaid Bhawan Palace in Jodhpur, in the presence of Shivraj's father, Gaj Singh II, mother Hemlata Rajye and elder sister Shivranjini Rajye.
Gayatri is studying computer graphics and animation. The wedding took place on 18 November 2010 at the Rambagh Palace in Jaipur. The wedding was a grand affair, with much media attention.

The couple have one daughter, Baiji Lal Sahiba Bhanwar Baisa Vaara Kumari Rajye, born 10 December 2011. On 16 November 2015, a baby boy, Raj Bhanwar Siraj Deo Singh, was born to the couple.

Ancestry

His mother, Hemlata Rajye, is daughter of the late Raja Shivratan Deo Singh of Poonch and Princess Nalini Rajye Lakshmi of Nepal in Dehra Dun. He has a sister who was born on 22 August 1974, Shivranjani Rajye.

He is a descendant of King Tribhuvan of Nepal and through King Tribhuvan, he is a descendant of popular personalities such as Maharaja Jang Bahadur Kunwar Ranaji, Kaji Tularam Pande, Sardar Ramakrishna Kunwar and Kaji General Amar Singh Thapa.

References

1975 births
Living people
People educated at Eton College
Alumni of Oxford Brookes University
Indian polo players
People from Jodhpur
Polo players from Rajasthan
Bullingdon Club members